Anarta mendica is a species of moth of the family Noctuidae. It is found in Turkey, Armenia, Azerbaijan, Israel and Lebanon.

Adults are on wing from April to June. There is one generation per year.

Subspecies
Anarta mendica mendica
Anarta mendica mendosa

External links
 Hadeninae of Israel

mendica
Insects of Turkey
Moths of the Middle East
Moths described in 1879